Libyan War may refer to:

 Mercenary War (241–238 BCE)
 Tripolitanian civil war (1793–1795)
 Italo-Turkish War (1911–1912)
 First Libyan Civil War (2011)
 2011 military intervention in Libya
 Second Libyan Civil War (2014–2020)

See also
List of wars involving Libya
 Libyan Civil War (disambiguation)